Byrd Baylor Schweitzer (March 28, 1924 – June 16, 2021) was an American novelist, essayist, and author of picture books for children. Four of her books have achieved Caldecott Honor status.

Background
Byrd Baylor was born in March 1924 in San Antonio, Texas. She was related to Robert Emmett Bledsoe Baylor, the namesake of Baylor University, and to Admiral Richard E. Byrd. Her first name, Byrd, is taken from her mother's maiden name.

Baylor attended the University of Arizona.

Writing
Baylor's work presents images of the Southwest and an intense connection between the land and the Native American people. Her prose illustrates vividly the value of simplicity, the natural world, and the balance of life within it.

Personal life
Baylor latterly lived in Arivaca, Arizona, in an adobe house that did not have electricity. She worked with three manual typewriters.

She died in June 2021 at the age of 97.

Caldecott Honors
Baylor was awarded Caldecott Honors for her books When Clay Sings (1973) with illustrator Tom Bahti, and The Desert is Theirs (1976), Hawk, I'm Your Brother (1977), and The Way to Start a Day (1979) with illustrator Peter Parnall.

Bibliography

Amigo (1963)
One Small Blue Bead (1965; illustrated by Symeon Shimin)
Before You Came This Way (1969)
Coyote Cry (1972)
When Clay Sings (1972)
Sometimes I Dance Mountains (1973)
Everybody Needs a Rock (1974; illustrated by Peter Parnall)
The Desert is Theirs (1975; illustrated by Peter Parnall) (Caldecott Honor)
Hawk, I’m Your Brother (1976; illustrated by Peter Parnall) (Caldecott Honor)
Yes Is Better than No (1977; with illustrations by Leonard Chana, 1990)
The Way to Start a Day (1978; illustrated by Peter Parnall) (Caldecott Honor)
The Other Way to Listen (1978; illustrated by Peter Parnall)
Your Own Best Secret Place (1979; illustrated by Peter Parnall)
If You Are a Hunter of Fossils (1980; illustrated by Peter Parnall)
Desert Voices (1981; illustrated by Peter Parnall)
I'm In Charge of Celebrations (1986; illustrated by Peter Parnall)
The Table Where Rich People Sit (1994; illustrated by Peter Parnall)

References 

1924 births
2021 deaths
American children's writers
University of Arizona alumni
Writers from San Antonio